Eustache Deschamps (13461406 or 1407) was a French poet, byname Morel, in French "Nightshade".

Life and career
Deschamps was born in Vertus. He received lessons in versification from Guillaume de Machaut and later studied law at Orleans University. He then traveled through Europe as a diplomatic messenger for Charles V, being sent on missions to Bohemia, Hungary and Moravia. In 1372 he was made huissier d'armes to Charles. He received many other important offices, was bailli of Valois, and afterwards of Senlis, squire to the Dauphin, and governor of Fismes.

In 1380, Charles died, and Deschamps's estate was pillaged by the English, after which he often used the name "Brulé des Champs". In his childhood he had been an eyewitness of the English invasion of 1358, he had been present at the siege of Reims in 1360 and seen the march on Chartres, and he had witnessed the signing of the Treaty of Brétigny. In consequence he hated the English and continuously abused them in his many poems.

Works
Deschamps wrote as many as 1,175 ballades, and he is sometimes credited with inventing the form. All but one of his poems are short, and they are mostly satirical, attacking the English, whom he regards as the plunderers of his country, and against the wealthy oppressors of the poor.  His satires were also directed at corrupt officials and clergy but his sharp wit may have cost him his job as Bailli of Senlis.

He was the author of a treatise on French verse entitled L'Art de dictier et de fere chansons, balades, virelais et rondeaulx, completed on 25 November 1392. Besides giving rules for the composition of the kinds of verse mentioned in the title he enunciates some theories on poetry. He divides music into music proper and poetry. Music proper he calls artificial on the ground that everyone could by dint of study become a musician; poetry he calls natural because he says it is not an art that can be acquired but a gift. He stresses the harmony of verse, because, as was the fashion of his day, he practically took it for granted that all poetry was to be sung.

His one long poetic work, Le Miroir de Mariage, is a 12,103-line satirical poem on the subject of women.  This work influenced Geoffrey Chaucer who used themes from the poem in his own work. Chaucer seems to be one of the few Englishmen Deschamps liked, as he composed a ballade in his honour (n. 285, probably written sometime after 1380) praising Chaucer as a great philosopher, translator, ethicist, and poet.

He also wrote about the decline in morals of his time, and also of the worsening state of affairs during the late middle ages, mentioning war, famine and disease.

Deschamps wrote two texts upon his teacher Machaut's death in 1377. They were combined and set to music into Armes, amours/O flour des flours (Weapons, loves/O flower of flowers), a double ballade for four voices by F. Andrieu.

Notes

References

Sources

External links

 A few examples of his poems
 One of his poems in translation

1340 births
1406 deaths
French poets
French male poets